Nomhlangano Beauty Mkhize was a South African activist, politician, shop steward and wife to late Saul Mkhize. She was born in Sophia Town and she was forcibly removed to Meadowlands in Soweto and that's where she met her husband.

Early years 
Mkhize grew up under the apartheid era, where she resided in Sophiatown, Johannesburg.

Career 
She and her husband led the struggle against forced removals in Driefontein.

References 

Anti-apartheid activists
1946 births
1977 deaths